Fun-Tastic is the second album by German Eurodance group Fun Factory.

Track listing
 Dreaming — 5:22
 Celebration — 3:26
 Doh Wah Diddy — 4:43
 Oh Yeah Yeah (I Like It) — 4:50
 I Love You — 4:56
 Don't Fight — 5:57
 I Wanna B with U — 3:33
 Together Forever — 6:30
 Don't Go Away — 5:09
 All For You (Close To You 2) — 4:20
 Be Good To Me — 4:25
 Back In The Days — 6:10
 Take Your Chance — 3:56

Charts
Album

Singles

References

External links
 Fun-Tastic on Discogs

1995 albums
Fun Factory (band) albums
Curb Records albums